AM-251 may refer to

 USS Inflict (AM-251)
 AM-251 a CB1 cannabinoid receptor antagonist